Aylesford School and Sixth Form College is a coeducational all-through school and sixth form located in Warwick, England. It was constructed on part of the land that made up RAF Warwick which closed in 1946.

References

External links 
 School website

Academies in Warwickshire
Educational institutions established in 1968
Buildings and structures in Warwick
Secondary schools in Warwickshire
1968 establishments in England
Primary schools in Warwickshire